Ian Strachan is a retired minister from Aberdeen, Scotland in the United Kingdom. He served with the Church of Scotland. He is reported to be the last Scottish missionary in Ghana. He worked with the Evangelical Presbyterian Church, Ghana.

He travelled with his wife Moyer to Ghana in 1959 as a Youth Worker of the Church of Scotland. In 1961, the Hohoe Secondary School was established in the Volta Region and he became its first Headmaster in September 1961.

He was the minister in charge of the Selkirk Parish Church in Selkirk, Scottish Borders in Scotland between 1987 and 1994.

Ian Strachan spoke in the Ewe language when he was invited to the celebration of the anniversary of the London branch of the Evangelical Presbyterian Church at East Dulwich.

See also
Church of Scotland
Evangelical Presbyterian Church, Ghana

References

Year of birth missing (living people)
Living people
Place of birth missing (living people)
20th-century Ministers of the Church of Scotland
Scottish Protestant missionaries
Protestant missionaries in Ghana
Youth work
Scottish educators